The Rock 'n' Roll Madrid Marathon is an annual marathon race which takes place in Madrid, Spain, in late April. The event was first held in 1978 and has since gained IAAF Gold Label Road Race status and had over 15,000 runners participate in the 2017 edition. A 10 km road race was added in 2010 and a Half Marathon road race was added in 2012.

The race course begins near Paseo de Recoletos and heads north past the Biblioteca Nacional de España, then the Santiago Bernabéu Stadium. After 8 kilometres the route turns southwards and heads back towards Nuevos Ministerios. Runners then follow a twisting south-westerly route. After passing Plaza Mayor, it goes north past the Royal Palace of Madrid and reaches the half marathon mark at Parque del Oeste.

After exiting the park, it traces a path south for a few kilometres and includes a six-kilometre loop within Casa de Campo. After a section which loops back south and north, the course heads east, uphill towards Madrid Atocha railway station. It runs along the perimeter of Buen Retiro Park and finishes inside the park at Paseo del Duque de Fernán Nuñez. The combination of an undulating course, the last 10 km approximately uphill, and the altitude of the city has made it difficult for runners to produce fast marathon times. The course is AIMS-certified and is eligible for record performances. The course records are 2:09:15 for the men's race (set by Ezekiel Kiptoo Chebii in 2014) and 2:32:04 for the women's race (set by Mehtap Doğan-Sızmaz in 2009).

Competitor Group, Inc., an American organiser of the Rock 'n' Roll Marathon series, partnered with local Mapoma Club in April 2011, making it Competitor's first event outside the United States.

The 2020 edition of the race was cancelled due to the coronavirus pandemic, with all registrants given the option of transferring their entry to 2021, 2022, or 2023, or obtaining a refund (minus management fees).

Past winners

Marathon
Key:

10K de Madrid

Statistics
Note: Marathon statistics only

Winners by country

Multiple winners

See also
Valencia Marathon
Barcelona Marathon
Seville Marathon
Madrid Half Marathon

Notes

References

List of winners
Loonstra, Klaas (2010-04-27). Madrid Marathon. Association of Road Running Statisticians. Retrieved on 2010-04-29.

External links

Official website
Event organisers, Competitor Group of San Diego, California, USA

Sports competitions in Madrid
Marathons in Spain
Recurring sporting events established in 1978
Spring (season) events in Spain
Dalian Wanda Group